"Thank U For" is a digital single released by South Korean singer XIA, intended to be a Christmas Eve present for his fans. The song was written by Japanese producers Shikata and Reo, with lyrics penned by XIA's twin brother, Juno and Kim Ji-na. Released on December 24, it debuted atop the daily charts. "Thank U For" peaked at number 9 on the weekly chart by South Korea's record chart Gaon.
The song was performed live at XIA's year-end concert "2012 XIA Ballad & Musical Concert with Orchestra".

Track list

References

2012 singles
K-pop songs
Christmas songs
2012 songs